Maponyane is a surname. Notable people with the surname include:

Maps Maponyane (born 1990), South African television presenter and actor
Marks Maponyane (born 1962), South African footballer
Walter Maponyane (born 1987), South African footballer

Bantu-language surnames